In Islamic context, the Mi'ad ( mi‘ād) is the resurrection and the fifth Shi'a Usūl ad-Dīn. It is the belief that Allah will resurrect all of mankind to be judged. 

It is also commonly referred to an Islamic "day of judgement", "day of resurrection" or "the last hour". Muslims believe on a day decided by Allah and known solely by Allah, life on Earth will cease to exist and Allah will erase everything. On this day every person to ever live will rise to face judgement by Allah.

Shia eschatology
Islamic terminology